Tarzan's Savage Fury is a 1952 film directed by Cy Endfield and starring Lex Barker as Tarzan, Dorothy Hart as Jane, and Patric Knowles. While most Tarzan films of the 1930s, 1940s and 1950s presented Tarzan as a very different character from the one in Edgar Rice Burroughs' novels, this movie does make some allusions to the novels. It was shot in Chatsworth, California's Iverson Movie Ranch. The film was the last to be directed by Cyril "Cy" Endfield in the US. Finding himself one of Hollywood's film-makers blacklisted by the House Un-American Activities Committee he moved to Britain. The film was co-written by Cyril Hume, who'd contributed substantially to the "Tarzan" series back in its bigger budget MGM days. At 81 minutes, this is the longest Tarzan film since Tarzan's Secret Treasure in 1941.

Plot
Tarzan agrees, against his better judgement, to guide supposed British government agents Edwards and Rokov into the land of the Wazuri Tribe, to harvest uncut diamonds for national-defense purposes. It transpires the "agents" are secretly criminals who intend to use the gems for their own sinister purposes.

Cast
 Lex Barker as Tarzan
 Dorothy Hart as Jane
 Patric Knowles as Edwards, a British traitor
 Charles Korvin as Rokov, a Russian agent
 Tommy Carlton as Joseph 'Joey' Martin
 Wesley Bly as Native Captive (uncredited)
 Darby Jones as Witch Doctor (uncredited)
 Peter Mamakos as Pilot (uncredited)
 Bill Walker as Native Chief (uncredited)

Production
The film was originally known as Tarzan, the Hunted.

Critical reception
Variety wrote that the film was, "A series of unexciting jungle heroics are offered..." Recent TV guides for re-run viewers say little more. The Radio Times wrote that "plenty of action helps the story along", and TV Guide wrote that the film was "uninteresting and slowly paced."

References

External links
 

1952 films
1950s fantasy adventure films
American fantasy adventure films
American sequel films
Films shot in California
Tarzan films
Films directed by Cy Endfield
Films produced by Sol Lesser
Films scored by Paul Sawtell
American black-and-white films
1950s English-language films
1950s American films